The Haitian Music Awards (HMA), is an annual Haitian music awards show that officially first took place on Sunday April 12, 2009 at the renowned Avery Fisher Hall at New York’s Lincoln Center for the Performing Arts.

History
The first Haitian Music Awards (on a more international stage) took place during the month of February 2009. This inaugural music awards honored the pioneer and founder of compas direct, Nemours Jean-Baptiste and showcased the works of artists from the entire Haitian music spectrum.

Compas on Broadway is the premier Haitian Music Awards event and the first of its kind in New York City. The nominees included individual bands such as the legendary Tabou Combo, Djakout Mizik, Nu-Look, Carimi, T-Vice, and not limited to individual artists as Emeline Michel, Misty Jean and Alan Cavé.

See also 
 Music of Haiti

References

Latin American music awards
Haitian music
Haitian awards